LISREL (linear structural relations) is a proprietary statistical software package used in structural equation modeling (SEM) for manifest and latent variables. It requires a "fairly high level of statistical sophistication".

History
LISREL was developed in the 1970s by Karl Jöreskog, then a scientist at Educational Testing Service in Princeton, New Jersey, and Dag Sörbom, later both professors of Uppsala University in Sweden. The most current version is LISREL 11 and can be downloaded from https://ssicentral.com/index.php/products/lisrel/.

Command language, graphical user interface and delivery
LISREL is mainly syntax-based, although recent versions have featured a graphical user interface (GUI).

SSI (Scientific Software International) has recently changed from e-Academy to a "home-built" solution for distributing the rental (6- or 12-month) versions of their software.

See also
 Confirmatory factor analysis
 Multivariate analysis
 Path analysis (statistics)
 Structural equation modeling

References

Further reading

External links
Official website

Statistical software